Mureno Peak is the rocky, mostly ice-free peak rising to 1275 m in the north part of Aldomir Ridge on southern Trinity Peninsula in Graham Land, Antarctica, between Sjögren and Boydell Glaciers.

The peak is named after the settlement of Mureno in Western Bulgaria.

Location

Maps
 Antarctic Digital Database (ADD). Scale 1:250000 topographic map of Antarctica. Scientific Committee on Antarctic Research (SCAR), 1993–2016.

Notes

References
 Mureno Peak. SCAR Composite Antarctic Gazetteer.
 Bulgarian Antarctic Gazetteer. Antarctic Place-names Commission. (details in Bulgarian, basic data in English)

External links
 Mureno Peak. Copernix satellite image

Mountains of Trinity Peninsula
Bulgaria and the Antarctic